The thirteenth season of Food Paradise, an American food reality television series narrated by Jess Blaze Snider on the Travel Channel, premiered on November 19, 2017. First-run episodes of the series aired in the United States on the Travel Channel on Mondays at 10:00 p.m. EDT. The season contained 13 episodes and concluded airing on January 14, 2018.

Food Paradise features the best places to find various cuisines at food locations across America. Each episode focuses on a certain type of restaurant, such as "Diners", "Bars", "Drive-Thrus" or "Breakfast" places that people go to find a certain food specialty.

Episodes

Gulf Grubbin'

Midway Munchies

Extreme Burgers

Island Eats

A Taste of Time

Saucy!

Lots of Cluck

Classic Combos

Country Cookin'

All in the Family

Farm to Feast

Rise and Dine

More Bite For the Buck

References

External links
Food Paradise @Travelchannel.com

2017 American television seasons
2018 American television seasons